Frank Greenfield Lankford (born March 26, 1971) is a former Major League Baseball right-handed pitcher.  He is an alumnus of the University of Virginia.

Drafted by the New York Yankees in the 17th round of the 1993 MLB amateur draft, Lankford would make his Major League Baseball debut with the Los Angeles Dodgers on March 31, 1998, and appear in his final game on May 13, 1998. He now lives in Atlanta, GA and is part of the coaching staff at his hometown high school, Westminster.

External links

Baseball players from Georgia (U.S. state)
1971 births
Living people
Los Angeles Dodgers players
Major League Baseball pitchers
University of Virginia alumni
Virginia Cavaliers baseball players
Oneonta Yankees players
Greensboro Bats players
Tampa Yankees players
Norwich Navigators players
Columbus Clippers players
Gulf Coast Yankees players
Modesto A's players
Sacramento River Cats players